The third edition of the Eindhoven Team Time Trial took place on June 24, 2007. It featured a team time trial in and around the Dutch city of Eindhoven. Former winners Gerolsteiner and Team CSC were expected to be amongst the favourites for the win.

Team CSC, led by United States national time trial champion David Zabriskie, won their second Eindhoven Team Time Trial in succession, clocked 0.43 seconds faster than wild card team Tinkoff Credit Systems.

Results

24-06-2007: Eindhoven, 48.6 km. (TTT)

External links
 

2007
2007 UCI ProTour
Eindhoven